Auleja Parish is an administrative unit of Krāslava Municipality, Latvia.

Villages and settlements of Auleja parish 
 Auleja (parish centre)

Parishes of Latvia
Krāslava Municipality